This is list of notable Nursing colleges in India.

States

Andhra Pradesh
 Dr. NTR University of Health Sciences
 Sri Venkateswara Institute of Medical Sciences, College of Nursing Chittoor	Govt.
 College of Nursing, Sri Padmavati Mahila Visvavidyalayam Chittoor	Govt.
 Sri Padmavathamma Government College of Nursing, Svmc/Svrrggh Campus Chittoor Govt.
 Balaji College of Nursing Chittoor	Pvt.
 Apollo College of Nursing Chittoor	Pvt.
 Aragonda Apollo College of Nursing Chittoor	Pvt.
 College of Nursing, CMC Vellore, Chittoor Campus Pvt.
 KKC College of B. Sc. Nursing Chittoor	Pvt.
 Katrina Moller College of Nursing, Arogyavaram Medical Centre Chittoor	Pvt.
 Kuppam College of Nursing Chittoor	Pvt.
 PES College of Nursing, PESIMSR Campus Chittoor	Pvt.
 Save College of Nursing Chittoor	Pvt.
 Sri Krishna Chaitanya College of Nursing Chittoor Pvt.
 Sri Venketeshwara College of Nursing Chittoor Pvt.	
 Sri Vikas College of Nursing Chittoor Pvt.	
 Mandyam College of Nursing Chittoor	Pvt.	
 Sree Vidyanikethan College of Nursing Chittoor Pvt.
 Sri Chaitanya College of Nursing Chittoor Pvt.
 Varma College of Nursing Chittoor

Arunachal Pradesh

Assam

Bihar
 Anugrah Narayan Magadh Medical College and Hospital
 Darbhanga Medical College and Hospital
 Indira Gandhi Institute of Medical Sciences
 Nalanda Medical College Hospital
 Narayan Medical College and Hospital

Chhattisgarh
 Ayush & Health Sciences University Chhattisgarh

Goa
 Institute of Nursing Education, Bambolim
 Vrundavan Institute of Nursing Education, Colvale

Gujarat

Haryana

 Maharishi Markandeshwar University, Mullana
 Pandit Bhagwat Dayal Sharma Post Graduate Institute of Medical Sciences
 Philadelphia Hospital & School of Nursing, Ambala

Himachal Pradesh

Jharkhand

Karnataka
 Government College Of Nursing, Fort , Bangalore
 Father Muller Medical College
 National Institute of Mental Health and Neurosciences
 Nitte University
 Rajiv Gandhi University of Health Sciences
 Sri Devaraj Urs Medical College
 Vydehi Institute of Medical Sciences and Research Centre
 Yenepoya University

Kerala
 Jubilee Mission Medical College & Research Centre

Madhya Pradesh

Meghalaya
 North Eastern Indira Gandhi Regional Institute of Health and Medical Sciences

Maharashtra
Armed Forces Medical College
B. J. Medical College
Government Medical College, Nagpur
Grant Medical College and Sir Jamshedjee Jeejeebhoy Group of Hospitals
Maharashtra University of Health Sciences
SNDT Women's University

Manipur
 Jawaharlal Nehru Institute of Medical Sciences
 Regional Institute of Medical Sciences

Mizoram

Nagaland

Orissa
 MKCG Medical College and Hospital

Punjab
 Christian Medical College, Ludhiana
 Desh Bhagat University  
 Malwa College of Nursing
 Postgraduate Institute of Medical Education and Research
 Baba Farid University of Health Sciences

Rajasthan
 Tantia University

Sikkim
 Sikkim manipal institute of medical sciences

Tripura
 Tripura Medical College & Dr. B.R. Ambedkar Memorial Teaching Hospital

Tamil Nadu
 Jawaharlal Institute of Postgraduate Medical Education and Research
 J.K.K. Nattraja College of Nursing and Research/Sresakthimayeil Institute of Nursing and Research
 Madras Medical College
 Saveetha University
 Sri Ramachandra Medical College and Research Institute
 Tamil Nadu Dr. M.G.R. Medical University
 Vinayaka Missions University

Telangana
update nursing college in Telangana State of India.............. with college wikipedia..

Uttarakhand
 H.N.B. Uttarakhand Medical Education University
 Shri Guru Ram Rai Institute of Medical & Health Sciences
 Swami Rama Himalayan University

Uttar Pradesh
 Uttar Pradesh University of Medical Sciences
 Institute of Medical Sciences, Banaras Hindu University
King George's Medical University
Sharda University
 metro college of health sciences and research Read More

West Bengal
 Medical College and Hospital, Kolkata
 West Bengal University of Health Sciences

Union Territories

Delhi
 All India Institute of Medical Sciences, Delhi
 Jamia Hamdard
 Lady Hardinge Medical College

Jammu and Kashmir
 Sher-i-Kashmir Institute of Medical Sciences

References

Nursing
 
India
Nursing colleges